The 8G Band is the house band for Late Night with Seth Meyers. The band is led by Saturday Night Live alumnus Fred Armisen. He assembled the 8G Band, named for the studio where the show is taped, just two weeks before the test show. He texted friends Seth Jabour, Syd Butler, and Eli Janney ("What are you guys doing this week?"), then found first drummer Kimberly Thompson through an audition. Jabour and Butler are members of the Brooklyn rock and roll band Les Savy Fav, and Butler also owns Frenchkiss Records. Guitarist Marnie Stern later joined as well.

Members
Fred Armisen (bandleader, rhythm guitar, drums)
Seth Jabour (lead guitar)
Syd Butler (bass)
Eli Janney (keys)
Marnie Stern (lead/rhythm guitar)

Past members
Kimberly Thompson (drums)

Kristina Schiano (drums)

References

Late Night with Seth Meyers
Radio and television house bands
Musical groups established in 2014
2015 establishments in the United States